Pallivahankivi is a 10 meter tall glacially deposited rock that is located in the region of Pallivaha. The region of Pallivaha is named after the rock. The rock is associated with a Finnish folkstory, according to the legend, the rock was thrown into its current place by giants from the region of Nunnavuori. Later legends say that the rock became a shelter for criminals who lived in the area.

See also 
Piispanristi
Nunnavuori
Church builders Killi and Nalli

References